Statistics of Division 2 in the 1963–64 season.

Overview
It was contested by 18 teams, and Lille won the championship, after Le Havre was disqualified.

League standings

References
France - List of final tables (RSSSF)

Ligue 2 seasons
French
2